The European Molecular Biology Organization (EMBO) is a professional, non-profit organization of more than 1,800 life scientists. Its goal is to promote research in life science and enable international exchange between scientists. It co-funds courses, workshops and conferences, publishes five scientific journals and supports individual scientists.  The organization was founded in 1964 and is a founding member of the Initiative for Science in Europe.  the Director of EMBO is Fiona Watt, a stem cell researcher, professor at King's College London and a group leader at the European Molecular Biology Laboratory.

Conferences and journals 
EMBO funds or co-funds over 90 meetings involving more than 11,000 participants every year.

EMBO publishes five peer-reviewed scientific journals: The EMBO Journal, EMBO Reports, Molecular Systems Biology, EMBO Molecular Medicine, and Life Science Alliance,

History
The European Molecular Biology Organization (EMBO) was launched in July 1964 after a group of European biologists had discussed the idea earlier at a meeting in Ravello.  The initial goals of EMBO  consisted of creating a central European laboratory for life sciences and increasing scientific interactions between researchers in Europe. At the Ravello meeting, Max Perutz was elected as the first EMBO chairman and John Kendrew as secretary general.

Initially, 140 biologists were elected EMBO members and in 1969, the European Molecular Biology Conference (EMBC) was set up as a political body with 14 countries as initial members.  Since 1964, scientists have been elected annually as members of EMBO based on excellence in research. There are currently more than 1,800 Members of the European Molecular Biology Organization, 90 of whom have received the Nobel Prize. As of 2018, the EMBC has 30 member states, two associate member states (India, Singapore) and two co-operation partners (Chile (CONICYT), Taiwan (MOST and Academia Sinica)).

In 1982, the EMBO Journal was launched, in 1986, the EMBO Gold Medal, an annual award for young scientists, was established. The "Young Investigator Program" which awards grants to young professors was established in 2000 and four additional journals were launched in 2000 (EMBO Reports), 2005 (Molecular Systems Biology), 2008 (EMBO Molecular Medicine) and 2019 (Life Science Alliance). Life Science Alliance is co-published with Rockefeller University Press and Cold Spring Harbor Laboratory Press. In 2022, Fiona Watt was appointed sixth director of EMBO succeeding the previous EMBO Directors Raymond Appleyard, John Tooze, Frank Gannon, Hermann Bujard and Maria Leptin.

In 2011, EMBO established a Policy Programme which interacts with policymakers and provides analysis of concerns emerging from advances in scientific research.

Closely affiliated organisations to EMBO include the  European Molecular Biology Laboratory (EMBL), and The  Federation of European Biochemical Societies (FEBS) which like EMBO, primarily operate in the  European Research Area (ERA).

References